A stronghold or fortification is a military construction or building designed for defense.

Stronghold may also refer to:

Computing and gaming
 Stronghold (1993 video game), a real-time strategy game by Stormfront Studios
 Stronghold (2001 video game), a real-time strategy game by Firefly Studios
 Stronghold (Magic: The Gathering), a 1998 expansion set for Magic: the Gathering from the Rath block
 Stronghold, a town alignment in Heroes of Might and Magic III: The Restoration of Erathia
 Stronghold, a warring faction in Heroes of Might and Magic V: Tribes of the East
 FIRST Stronghold, the 2016 FIRST Robotics Competition game

Music
 Stronghold (Magnum album)
 Stronghold (Summoning album)
 Stronghold – The Collector's Hit Box, an album by Jennifer Rush

Places
 Stronghold (Washington, D.C.), a neighborhood in the District of Columbia, U.S.
 Stronghold Center or Stronghold Castle, a Tudor-style castle in Oregon, Illinois, built by newspaper publisher Walter Strong

Other uses
 Stronghold (novel), a novel by Melanie Rawn
 Stronghold, Edward Sedgewick, a character in the comic book series Harbinger
 "Stronghold", an episode of Stargate SG-1
 Stronghold (film), a 1951 movie starring Veronica Lake
 Stronghold (pet medicine) or Selamectin, a parasiticide and anthelmintic for cats and dogs
 HMS Stronghold, a Royal Navy S-class destroyer launched in 1919 and sunk in 1942

See also 
 Safe seat, in politics, a seat in a legislative body that is regarded as fully secured by a particular political party